James Staunton (b Ballyoskill 20 February 1889; d Enniscorthy 27 June 1963) was an Irish Roman Catholic Bishop.

Staunton was ordained priest on 22 June 1913. He served in the Diocese of Ossory. A Jesuit, he was Bishop of Ferns from 1938 until his death.
Dr Staunton was a council father at the Second Vatican Council.

References

People from County Kilkenny
1889 births
1963 deaths
20th-century Irish Roman Catholic priests
Roman Catholic bishops of Ferns
Irish Jesuits